G protein-coupled receptor 148, also known as GPR148, is a human orphan receptor from GPCR superfamily. It is expressed primarily in nervous system and testis. Is may be implicated in prostate cancer.

References

Further reading

G protein-coupled receptors